David Petrović (born 14 March 2003) is a Serbian football left back who plays for Grafičar.

References

External links
 

2003 births
Living people
Association football defenders
Sportspeople from Čačak
Serbian footballers
Serbian First League players
RFK Grafičar Beograd players